Sadak-Arjuni is a taluka in Arjuni Morgaon Subdivision of Gondiya district, Maharashtra, India

Gondiya district
There are eight talukas in Gondiya district, they are Amgaon, Arjuni-Morgaon, Deori, Gondiya, Goregaon, Sadak-Arjuni, Salekasa, Tirora.

Culture
The Mama-Bhasha fair is held in the villages of Satalwada (Sakoli taluka) and Giroli-Heti belonging to Sadak-Arjuni taluka. The fair is held on 1 and 2 January. In 2011, this fair was attended by 1 lakh persons.

References

Gondia district
Talukas in Maharashtra